Dârmănești is a commune in Argeș County, Muntenia, Romania. It is composed of five villages: Dârmănești, Negreni, Piscani, Valea Nandrii and Valea Rizii.

References

Communes in Argeș County
Localities in Muntenia